Anthony Shorten (born 12 June 1969) is an Australian Liberal National politician and a former Member of the Queensland Legislative Assembly.

Politics 
Shorten represented Algester from 2012 to 2015, having defeated Karen Struthers at the 2012 state election.

References

Liberal National Party of Queensland politicians
1969 births
Living people
Members of the Queensland Legislative Assembly
21st-century Australian politicians